P41 or P-41 may refer to:

Vessels 
 ARA Espora (P-41), a corvette of the Argentine Navy
 , a submarine transferred from the Royal Navy to the Royal Norwegian Navy
 , a patrol vessel of the Irish Naval Service
 
 P-41 Cormorán, a retired patrol boat of the Spanish Navy

Other uses 
 Papyrus 41, a biblical manuscript
 Phosphorus-41, an isotope of phosphorus
 Seversky XP-41, an American prototype fighter aircraft
 P41, a Latvian state regional road
 P41, a Mazda auto racing engine developed by Advanced Engine Research